The Knobby Russet, also known as Knobbed Russet, Winter Russet, Old Maids, and Winter Apple, is a large green and yellow apple cultivar with a rough and black russet and unusually irregular, warty, and knobbly surface. It has a soft and sweet creamy flesh and looks more like a potato than an apple.  Knobby Russets are harvested in mid to late October and are in season between October and February/March.

References

External links
 Apple Varieties. Retrieved on 14 October 2006.

British apples
Apple cultivars